Farrell Spence is a Canadian Roots/Americana singer and songwriter from Vancouver, British Columbia, Canada.

Career
In April 2007, Spence released her first CD, A Town Called Hell. It received positive reviews from various UK, Irish and American music magazines who focus on the Americana/Bluegrass scene. In 2008 in Vancouver, Spence joined with Trish Klein and Frazey Ford of The Be Good Tanyas, Simon Kendall of Doug and The Slugs, Rob Wilson, Mark Beatty, Khari McClelland and John Raham for a series of live gospel shows titled The Sweet Sounds Gospel Show.

In June 2008, Spence moved to Cork, Ireland to write songs for a new CD, Song for the Sea. She worked with Eoghan Regan, David Murphy, and NC Lawlor. However, she did not complete the project with them. In 2008 she also participated in live gospel show together with some other musicians such as Trish Klein and Frazey Ford of "The Be Good Tanyas" to be contributed to the Greater Vancouver Food Bank.

In the spring of 2009, Spence and Italian guitar player and lyricist, Francesco Forni, began playing live dates in Italy, Ireland and Northern Ireland. They were then invited to an interview and live performance on BBC Radio in May 2009 after they were seen performing at The Errigle Inn in Belfast.

Spence and Forni collaborated on the recording of Spence's second album, Song for the Sea in room 501 of the Ripa Hotel in Rome, Italy. The duo were seeking an organic and natural sound. In September 2011, they released the CD recordings at live shows in Rome, Italy and at Teatro Valle and Riunione Di Condiminio.

Two of Spence's songs were licensed for Showtime's 'The Chris Isaak Show'. Her songs were heard on CBC Radio in Canada, RTÉ Radio in Ireland, BBC Radio in the UK along with college and independent radio stations and net-stations.

She currently lives in Ireland where she makes live shows as well as in Canada.

Discography
 A Town Called Hell (2007)
 Song for the Sea (2011)

Reviewers' comments

References

External links
 Farrell Spence's website
 Farrell Spence on SoundCloud
 Farrell Spence and Francesco Forni on BBC Radio

Canadian women singers
Canadian singer-songwriters
Living people
Year of birth missing (living people)